Judah Benjamin Middleman (1797 or 1798 – 1 June 1865) was a Galician-born English and American rabbi and writer.

Biography
Middleman was a native of Lemberg, later settling in Warsaw and then London. There he wrote Netivot Emet, a work written in defense of the traditions of the Talmud against the attacks, in Old Paths, of Alexander McCaul. Only the first part of the Netivot Emet was published, in 1847, along with an English translation by Hebraist Marcus Heinrich Bresslau under the title Paths of Truth; being a Defence of the Talmudical Traditions against the attacks in the "Old Paths," by the Rev. Dr. McCaul.

From England he immigrated to New York in 1848. He was a founder of the city's Beth Hamedrash in 1852, and supplemented his income before Passover as the congregation's matzah baker. After a disagreement with the synagogue's rabbi over the hiring of a shoḥet, Middleman and his followers split from the Beth Hamedrash to form the Kalvarier Synagogue at 15 Pike Street.

Bibliography

References
 

1790s births
1865 deaths
English rabbis
English people of Polish-Jewish descent
19th-century British Jews
Orthodox rabbis from Galicia (Eastern Europe)
People of Galician-Jewish descent
Orthodox rabbis from New York City
Writers from Lviv
19th-century American rabbis